Valpei  (Valpei-Hukua) is an Oceanic language spoken on the northern tip of Espiritu Santo Island in Vanuatu.

References

Espiritu Santo languages
Languages of Vanuatu